The 1951 Mississippi gubernatorial election took place on November 6, 1951, in order to elect the Governor of Mississippi. Incumbent Democrat Fielding L. Wright was term-limited, and could not run for reelection to a second full term. As was common at the time, the Democratic candidate ran unopposed in the general election so therefore the Democratic primary was the real contest, and winning the primary was considered tantamount to election.

Democratic primary
No candidate received a majority in the Democratic primary, which featured 7 contenders, so a runoff was held between the top two candidates. The runoff election was won by former Governor Hugh L. White, who defeated lawyer Paul B. Johnson Jr., son of former Governor Paul B. Johnson Sr.

Results

Runoff

General election
In the general election, White ran unopposed.

Results

References

1951
gubernatorial
Mississippi
November 1951 events in the United States